Elena Sokhryakova is a Russian long track speed skater.

At the 2022 Winter Olympics, she finished 22nd in the 1500 metres.

References

Place of birth missing (living people)
Russian female speed skaters
Living people
Speed skaters at the 2022 Winter Olympics
Olympic speed skaters of Russia
1990 births
Universiade silver medalists for Russia
Universiade bronze medalists for Russia
Universiade medalists in speed skating
Competitors at the 2017 Winter Universiade